Felipe Horacio Vásquez Lajara (October 22, 1860 – March 25, 1936) was a Dominican general and political figure. He served as the president of the Provisional Government Junta of the Dominican Republic in 1899, and again between 1902 and 1903. Supporters of Vásquez were known as Horacistas, as opposed to Jimenistas, supporters of Vásquez's main rival, Juan Isidro Jimenes. He ran for a full term as president in 1914, but lost to Jimenes.

In 1888, Vásquez married Trina de Moya, a poet and writer from La Vega.

Following the occupation of the Dominican Republic by U.S. military forces from 1916–1924, Vásquez was democratically elected as president of the country and served between 1924 and 1930, and again separately in 1930 before being ousted by General Rafael Trujillo and sent into exile in Puerto Rico.

A metro station in Santo Domingo is named after him.

References

|-

|-

1860 births
1936 deaths
19th-century Dominican Republic politicians
20th-century Dominican Republic politicians
People from Espaillat Province
Dominican Republic people of Spanish descent
Presidents of the Dominican Republic
Vice presidents of the Dominican Republic
Dominican Republic military personnel
Red Party (Dominican Republic) politicians
White Dominicans